Alisi Afeaki Taumoepeau is a Tongan politician. She became the first woman to hold a Cabinet post in Tonga when she was named Attorney general and Minister of Justice in 2006.

Career
Malia Viviena Alisi Nunia Taumoepeau studied law at Victoria University of Wellington in New Zealand, becoming the first Tongan woman with a degree in the subject. She had initially wanted to study medicine and mathematics but was not accepted for a scholarship. She turned to law at the suggestion of her father, Pousima Afeaki. Upon returning to Tonga she worked at the Crown Law Office for several years. By 2004 she had become solicitor general for the country. At the same time her husband Aisea Taumoepeau jointly held the posts of attorney general and Minister for Justice but was asked to resign. She was also pressured to resign by Prime Minister Fatafehi Tuʻipelehake, following her support of civil servants during a strike.

When Taumoepeau was named jointly as attorney general and Minister for Justice in 2006 it was the first time that a Tongan woman had been named to a cabinet post within the Tongan Government.

She was asked to resign her posts by the Tongan government, which she did effective May 31, 2009. Following her resignation her former role was split into two, with John Cauchi succeeding her as attorney general, and Samiu Vaipulu becoming the new Minister of Justice. At the time there was no official comment but it was later reported that it was after she mislead the Cabinet. Following the resignation of Cauchi from the attorney general post, she agreed with his allegations that both resignations were after the Cabinet interfered in the country's legal system.

In September 2020 she was made a King's Counsel. She then worked as chief executive for the Office of the Ombudsman.

In February 2023 she was sworn in as acting Ombudsman, replacing her husband, ʻAisea Taumoepeau.

Honours
National honours
  Order of Queen Sālote Tupou III, Grand Cross (31 July 2008).

References

|-

|-

Year of birth missing (living people)
Living people
Government ministers of Tonga
Solicitors-General of Tonga
Attorneys General of Tonga
21st-century women politicians
Women government ministers of Tonga
20th-century Tongan women
21st-century Tongan women 
20th-century Tongan people
21st-century Tongan people
Dames Grand Cross of the Order of Queen Sālote Tupou III
Victoria University of Wellington alumni